Chirai may refer to:
 , a character in Dragon Ball media
 Chirai River, a river in western India in Gujarat
 Madrasa (grape), a grape variety also known as Chirai
 Sirai (also spelled Chirai), a 1984 Indian drama film